Hemidactylus tamhiniensis, the Tamhini giant rock gecko or basalt giant rock gecko, is a species of gecko. It is endemic to India.

References

Hemidactylus
Reptiles described in 2021
Endemic fauna of India
Reptiles of India